William Joseph Burke (September 25, 1862 – November 7, 1925) was a British-born American politician and businessman.

Biography
Burke was born in London, England, of Irish parents. He served a four-year term on the Allegheny Common Council and from 1906 to 1910 was a member of the greater city council of Pittsburgh, until its merger with Allegheny City. Burke was a member of the Pennsylvania State Senate from 1915 to 1918.  He was a  U.S. Representative from Pennsylvania from 1919 to 1923, as a member of the United States Republican Party. In 1922, he ran for the United States Senate from Pennsylvania as a member of the Progressive Party and came in third place, receiving 8% of the vote. In the early 1900s he became interested in the development of oil near Callery, Butler County. He was involved with organized labor as a chairman of the Order of Railroad Conductors. He was interred in the Roman Catholic Calvary Cemetery, Pittsburgh, Pennsylvania.

External links 

1862 births
1925 deaths
Republican Party Pennsylvania state senators
Burials at Calvary Catholic Cemetery (Pittsburgh)
British emigrants to the United States
Politicians from Pittsburgh
Republican Party members of the United States House of Representatives from Pennsylvania
Pittsburgh City Council members
20th-century American politicians